The Cotswolds is a constituency represented in the House of Commons of the UK Parliament by Sir Geoffrey Clifton-Brown, a Conservative, since its 1997 creation.

Members of Parliament

Constituency profile
The Cotswolds is a safe Conservative seat.

The largest town in the constituency is Cirencester, a compact traditional town. Other settlements include Andoversford, Bourton-on-the-Water, Chipping Campden, Fairford, Lechlade, Moreton-in-Marsh, Northleach, Stow-on-the-Wold, Tetbury (and the neighbouring village of Doughton, location of Highgrove, the Prince of Wales's estate), and Wotton-under-Edge.

The seat has the highest number of listed buildings of any constituency in Britain. It also contains eight of the 20 most popular attractions in Gloucestershire, including Westonbirt Arboretum, Hidcote Manor, and Chedworth Roman Villa.

Workless claimants, registered jobseekers,  were in November 2012 significantly lower than the national average of 3.8%, at 1.6% of the population based on a statistical compilation by The Guardian.

This was also the constituency that, when declared during the 2015 UK general election, saw the Conservatives win a surprise majority, in which David Cameron was re-elected as prime minister; a hung parliament had been widely expected.

Boundaries

The constituency was created in 1997 as Cotswold, mostly from the former seat of Cirencester and Tewkesbury.  In 2010 the name was changed to The Cotswolds to reflect the commonly used name of the area.

2010–present: The District of Cotswold, and the District of Stroud wards of Kingswood, Minchinhampton, and Wotton-under-Edge.

1997–2010: The District of Cotswold, and the District of Stroud ward of Wotton and Kingswood.

As of 2022, there are plans to split the constituency into two smaller constituencies: North Cotswolds and South Cotswolds, in the hope of evening up voter numbers relative to other constituencies.

Elections

Elections in the 2010s

Elections in the 2000s

Elections in the 1990s

See also
List of parliamentary constituencies in Gloucestershire

Notes

References

Parliamentary constituencies in South West England
Constituencies of the Parliament of the United Kingdom established in 1997
Politics of Gloucestershire
Cotswolds